Klaus Schmidt may refer to:
 Klaus Schmidt (mathematician) (born 1943), Austrian mathematician
 Klaus Schmidt (archaeologist) (1953–2014), German archaeologist
 Klaus Schmidt (footballer) (born 1967), Austrian footballer
 Klaus M. Schmidt (born 1961), German economist